Alpbach is a small river of Bavaria, Germany. It flows through the town of Tegernsee into the lake Tegernsee, which is drained by the Mangfall.

See also
List of rivers of Bavaria

Rivers of Bavaria
Rivers of Germany